Pumiliopareia is an extinct genus of pareiasaurid parareptile from the Permian period of South Africa. It is known from a complete skeleton with osteoderms.

Description
Pumiliopareia was about 50 cm in length with a 12 cm skull.  It is the smallest known member of the pareiasaurs, measuring only a fifth as long as some of its larger relatives. Like Anthodon, its body was entirely covered with osteoderms. In analyses that support a pareiasaur origin of turtles, the sister taxon of the testudines. However it specifically shares with turtles a single trait only: Ribs greatly expanded anteroposteriorly (i.e. wide).

Classification
Originally included under the genus Nanoparia, it was given its own name by Lee 1997 who found it did not form a clade with Nanoparia luckhoffi, the type species of that genus, and preferred to have monophyletic genera. Nanoparia may still be a paraphyletic genus, which is allowed in Linanean binomial taxonomy, or it may be that all three pumiliopareiasaurs are similar enough to belong to single genus.

External links
 Elginiidae and Pumiliopareiasauria at Palaeos

Pareiasaurs
Permian reptiles of Africa
Fossil taxa described in 1948
Prehistoric reptile genera